An (simple) arc in finite projective geometry is a set of points which satisfies, in an intuitive way, a feature of curved figures in continuous geometries. Loosely speaking, they are sets of points that are far from "line-like" in a plane or far from "plane-like" in a three-dimensional space. In this finite setting it is typical to include the number of points in the set in the name, so these simple arcs are called -arcs. An important generalization of the -arc concept, also referred to as arcs in the literature, are the -arcs.

-arcs in a projective plane

If the plane  has order  then , however the maximum value of  can only be achieved if  is even. In a plane of order , a -arc is called an oval and, if  is even, a -arc is called a hyperoval.

Every conic in the Desarguesian projective plane PG(2,), i.e., the set of zeros of an irreducible homogeneous quadratic equation, is an oval. A celebrated result of Beniamino Segre states that when  is odd, every -arc in PG(2,) is a conic (Segre's theorem). This is one of the pioneering results in finite geometry.

Thus, every oval can be uniquely extended to a hyperoval in a finite projective plane of even order.

A -arc which can not be extended to a larger arc is called a complete arc. In the Desarguesian projective planes, PG(2,), no -arc is complete, so they may all be extended to ovals.

-arcs in a projective space

This definition generalizes the definition of a -arc in a plane (where ).

()-arcs in a projective plane

A-arc in a finite projective plane  (not necessarily Desarguesian) is a set,  of  points of  such that each line intersects  in at most  points, and there is at least one line that does intersect  in  points. A-arc is a -arc and may be referred to as simply an arc if the size is not a concern.

The number of points  of a -arc  in a projective plane of order  is at most .  When equality occurs, one calls  a maximal arc.

Hyperovals are maximal arcs. Complete arcs need not be maximal arcs.

See also

 Normal rational curve

Notes

References

External links

Projective geometry
Incidence geometry